West Air or Westair may refer to:

 West Air (China), a Chinese low-cost airline
 West Air (United States), an American airline
 West Air Luxembourg, a cargo airline
 West Air Sweden, a cargo airline
 WestAir Commuter Airlines, an American regional airline based in Fresno, California
 Westair Aviation, a Namibian aviation service provider
 Westair Benin, an airline based in Cotonou, Benin
 Westair de Mexico, a defunct Mexican cargo airline
 Westair (France), a defunct airline of France

See also
 Western Air
 Western Airlines
 Western (airline)
 Air West
 Hughes Airwest